Hiroshi Okuda (奥田 碩 Okuda Hiroshi; born December 29, 1932, in Mie Prefecture), is the former chairman of the Toyota Motor Corporation from 1999 to 2006.

Overview 

He became president of Toyota in 1995 and has worked at the corporation for 50 years. In 1998, Okuda was selected as a member of the Prime Minister's Economic Strategy Council of Japan and became chairman of the Japan Federation of Employers' Associations in 1999. He has also held the position of chairman of the Japan Automobile Manufacturers Association since 2000. Okuda holds a 4th dan black belt in Judo and graduated from Hitotsubashi University in 1955.

Okuda is credited with seeing the need for hybrid cars early and pushing Toyota towards quickly bringing them to market.

References

1932 births
Living people
People from Mie Prefecture
Hitotsubashi University alumni
Toyota people
KDDI
Japan Post Holdings
Japanese expatriates in the Philippines
Officiers of the Légion d'honneur
Presidents of the Japan Automobile Manufacturers Association